Southwest High School is a 5A public high school in the Southwest Independent School District of San Antonio, Texas, USA. In 2015, the school was rated "Met Standard" by the Texas Education Agency.

History
Southwest High School has been serving southwestern Bexar County for over 68 years. Established in 1951, it has grown from a small rural high school with a graduating class of 11 students to a major 6A high school with over 3000 students.

Organizations
The Dragons participate in UIL District 28 6A competitions for Academic Team, Athletics, Band, Drama, Choir, Color Guard, and Dance. Other co-curricular and extra-curricular opportunities include NJROTC, National Honor Society, Best Buddies, Student Council, FFA, TAFE, DECA, Skills USA, FCCLA, and Academic Decathlon along with a FIRST Robotics program.

Athletics
The Southwest Dragons compete in the following sports:

Baseball
Basketball
Cross Country
Football
Golf
Powerlifting
Soccer
Softball
Swimming and Diving
Tennis
Track and Field
Volleyball
Waterpolo

Academics
Southwest High School offers a complete academic program including 18 dual credit classes, in association with Palo Alto College, as well as Advanced Placement classes in Science and English.

Notable alumni
 Ty Detmer, Heisman Trophy winning quarterback who played in the National Football League for twelve seasons
 Chris Bordano, former American football linebacker in the National Football League
 Shea Serrano, New York Times bestselling author and writer.
 Destinee Hooker, 2012 summer Olympic volleyball athlete for Team USA. She won silver medal, but got best Spiker award for the 2012 summer Olympics.

References

External links
Southwest ISD

High schools in San Antonio
Public high schools in Bexar County, Texas
1951 establishments in Texas